is a Japanese manga series written by Shō Makura and illustrated by Takeshi Okano. It is a spin-off to Makura and Okano's Jigoku Sensei Nūbē. It was serialized in Shueisha Oh Super Jump (2007–2010) and Super Jump (2007–2011). A sequel, titled Reibaishi Izuna: Ascension, was serialized in Grand Jump (2011–2014) and Grand Jump Premium (2014–2016).

Publication
Written by Shō Makura and illustrated by Takeshi Okano, Reibaishi Izuna: The Spiritual Medium started in Shueisha's seinen manga magazine Oh Super Jump on July 18, 2007. It was also occasionally published in Super Jump, starting on November 28, 2007. Oh Super Jump ceased publication on July 20, 2010, and the series was formally transferred to Super Jump on September 8, 2010. The series finished in the last issue of the magazine, released on October 12, 2011. Shueisha collected its chapters in ten tankōbon volumes, released from August 4, 2008, and December 2, 2011.

The manga would continue in Shueisha's newly magazine Grand Jump; it was continued as a direct sequel, titled , on November 16, 2011. Its last chapter in the magazine was published on July 2, 2014, and the series was then transferred to Grand Jump Premium on August 27 of the same year. The series finished on June 22, 2016. Ten tankōbon volumes were published between April 19, 2012, and December 2, 2016.

Volume list

The Spiritual Medium

Ascension

References

External links
 

Exorcism in anime and manga
Hell Teacher Nūbē
Seinen manga
Shueisha manga
Yōkai in anime and manga